John Fitzpatrick (18 September 1905 – 3 December 1990) was an Irish hurler who played for Kilkenny Senior Championship club Carrickshock. He played for the Kilkenny senior hurling team for three seasons, during which time he usually lined out as a centre-forward.

Honours

Knockmoylan
Kilkenny Junior Hurling Championship (1): 1926

Carrickshock
Kilkenny Senior Hurling Championship (2): 1931, 1938
Kilkenny Junior Hurling Championship (1): 1928

Kilkenny
All-Ireland Senior Hurling Championship (2): 1932, 1933
Leinster Senior Hurling Championship (2): 1932, 1933
National Hurling League (1): 1932–33

References

1905 births
1990 deaths
Knockmoylan hurlers
Carrickshock hurlers
Kilkenny inter-county hurlers